Massimo Stano (born 27 February 1992) is a male Italian racewalker. He competed in the 20 kilometres walk event at the 2015 World Championships in Athletics in Beijing, China, finishing in the 19th position, and the same event at the 2020 Summer Olympics held in Tokyo, Japan, finishing in first place. On 24 July 2022, Stano won the 2022 World Athletics Championships with a championship record.

Career
Born in Grumo Appula, he grew up in Palo del Colle.
He started with athletics at 11 years-old with the Fiamma Olimpia Palo, middle-distance running mainly, then starting at 14 years-old to practise racewalking with his coach Giovanni Zaccheo. His club becomes for 4 years the Atletica Aden Exprivia Molfetta, the town where he trained. In 2011, he became a policeman as member of the Fiamme Oro. His first big athletics result comes from the 2013 European Athletics U23 Championships in Tampere where he finished initially fourth, but where he won first the bronze medal, then the silver after the doping disqualification of 2 Russians. To improve his results, he left Palo for Sesto San Giovanni taking a new coach, Alessandro Gandellini.

His new coach becomes Patrizio Percesepe. Very quickly, he started having better results: he won the national championships with a personal best, he finished third at the 2018 IAAF World Race Walking Team Championships in Taicang, China and 4th at the European Championships in Berlin, finishing at only 1 second from the podium. In June 2019, he established the new national record of 1:17:45, but then, he finished only 14th at the 2019 World Championships in Doha. 2020 was also a difficult year with more injuries (periostitis) and with Covid pandemic he started again walking at the European Cup in Poděbrady on 16 May 2021 where he finished 8th.

National records
 20 km walk: 1:17:45 ( A Coruña, 8 June 2019) - Current holder.

National titles
 Italian Athletics Championships
 10 km walk: 2018
 20 km walk: 2015, 2018, 2022

Personal life 
In 2016 Stano married Moroccan athlete Fatima Lotfi. They have a daughter, Sophie, and live together in Rome.

See also
 Italian records in athletics
 Italian all-time lists - 20 km walk
 Italy at the IAAF World Race Walking Cup
 Italy at the European Race Walking Cup
 Italy at the 2015 World Championships in Athletics

References

External links

 

Italian male racewalkers
Living people
Place of birth missing (living people)
1992 births
World Athletics Championships athletes for Italy
Athletics competitors of Fiamme Oro
Athletes (track and field) at the 2020 Summer Olympics
Medalists at the 2020 Summer Olympics
Olympic gold medalists in athletics (track and field)
Olympic gold medalists for Italy
Italian Muslims
Olympic athletes of Italy